Huddersfield Town's 1982–83 campaign was one of Town's most successful seasons in their recent history. Under the leadership of Mick Buxton, Town managed to secure their second promotion in 4 seasons, following their promotion from the Fourth Division in the 1979-80 season. This is also the only season in Town's history to date, in which they were unbeaten at home all season. They finished 3rd, behind Portsmouth and Cardiff City.

Squad at the start of the season

Review
Town had failed to get the good start to the season that they wanted by failing to win any of their first 5 league games. Following that start Mick Buxton made an inspired signing, the Liverpool striker Colin Russell. He scored two goals on his debut in Town's 2-0 win over Oxford United, which was followed by a 6-0 thrashing of Orient. Then, following a 3-game mini-blip, Town went on a run of 7 wins in a row. During that run, Mark Lillis scored 9 goals in 4 games, including 4 against Cardiff City.

As that run was winding down, Town also managed a sensational 1-0 win at Leeds United in the League Cup third round, in which David Cowling scored the famous header that knocked Town's rivals. They also gave a good thrashing to their other rivals Bradford City on New Year's Day, by beating them 6-3, in which Brian Stanton scored 4 times. Town's home form along with the goalscoring abilities of Mark Lillis, Colin Russell and Brian Stanton gave Town their only season in their history in which they didn't lose a single home game in any competition.

Town continued their run of good form for most of the remainder of the season and promotion was secured by beating promotion rivals Newport County at Leeds Road, which saw Town get promoted to Division 2 along with Portsmouth & Cardiff City.

Squad at the end of the season

Results

Division Three

FA Cup

League Cup

Appearances and goals

1982-83
English football clubs 1982–83 season